Dubovsky District is the name of several administrative and municipal districts in Russia.
Dubovsky District, Rostov Oblast, an administrative and municipal district of Rostov Oblast
Dubovsky District, Volgograd Oblast, an administrative and municipal district of Volgograd Oblast

See also
Dubovsky (disambiguation)

References